1916 in Argentine football saw Racing Club win their 4th consecutive league championship. Rosario Central won the Copa de Honor and the Copa de Competencia but they were beaten in both of the international finals.

In international football Argentina hosted the first edition of Copa América (named "Campeonato Sudamericano" by then) where they finished as runners un to Uruguay although they won four minor trophies later in the year.

Primera División

Final standings

Lower divisions

Intermedia
Champion: Sportivo Barracas

Segunda División
Champion: Huracán III

Domestic Cups

Copa de Honor Municipalidad de Buenos Aires

Final
Rosario Central 1-0 Independiente

Copa de Competencia Jockey Club

Final
Rosario Central 2-1 Independiente

Copa Ibarguren

Final
Racing Club 6-0 Rosario Central

(3rd title)

International cups

Tie Cup
Champions:  Peñarol

Final

Copa de Honor Cousenier
Champions:  Nacional (3rd title)

Final

Copa Dr. Ricardo C. Aldao
Champions:  Nacional

Final

Argentina national team
To commemorate the centennial of the Declaration of Independence, Argentina hosted and participated in the first edition of the 1916 South American Championship, later named Copa América. Argentina finished as runners-up to Uruguay.

The national squad won the Copa Círculo de la Prensa, Copa Lipton, Copa Newton and Copa Premier Honor Uruguayo that year.

Copa Lipton

Copa Newton

Copa Premier Honor Uruguayo

Results

Notes

References

External links
Argentina 1916 by Osvaldo José Gorgazzi at rsssf.
Argentine domestic cups by Osvaldo José Gorgazzi  at rsssf.

 
Seasons in Argentine football